Fernando Fernández Martín (born 29 May 1943 in Santa Cruz de La Palma, Tenerife)
is a Spanish politician who was the president of the Canary Islands between 1987 and 1988. 
He is now a Member of the European Parliament with the People's Party,
part of the European People's Party, and sits on
the European Parliament's Committee on Development.

He is a substitute member of the Committee on Regional Development, a vice-chair of the
Delegation for relations with the countries of the Andean Community and a
substitute member for the
Delegation to the ACP-EU Joint Parliamentary Assembly.

Education
 1965: Graduate in medicine and surgery (Navarre)
 1966: diploma in Neurology (Barcelona)
 1967: Paris
 1968: specialist in clinical neurophysiology and neurology (Navarre)
 1975: doctor of medicine

Career
 1965-1968: Assistant lecturer in neurology (Navarre)
 1969-1979: Senior lecturer in medical pathology (La Laguna)
 1984: Deputy professor in neurology (La Laguna)
 1971-1999: Head of the Neurology Department at the University Hospital of the Canary Islands
 1994-1999: Member of the PP Regional Executive Committee (Canary Islands, 1991–2004) and of the PP National Executive Committee
 1983-1994: Member of the Canary Islands Regional Parliament
 1983-1989: Regional President of the Social Democratic Centre party (CDS) in the Canary Islands
 1991-1994: Chairman of the PP parliamentary group
 1987-1990: President of the Autonomous Government of the Canary Islands
 since 1994: Member of the European Parliament
 1999-2001: Vice-Chairman of the Committee on Development
 1994-2004: Member of the ACP-EU Joint Parliamentary Assembly
 2001-2004: Vice-Chairman of the Delegation for relations with the countries of South America and Mercosur
 2004: Chairman of the ad hoc delegations for Venezuela (2003) and for Bolivia
 Member of election observation missions for various electoral processes in Africa and Latin America

Decorations
 Chain of the Order of the Canary Islands
 Medal of the Spanish Senate and other national and foreign decorations

See also
 2004 European Parliament election in Spain

External links
 
 

Fernandez Martin, Fernando
Fernandez Martin, Fernando
Fernandez Martin, Fernando
People from Tenerife
Fernandez Martin, Fernando
Fernandez Martin, Fernando
MEPs for Spain 1999–2004
MEPs for Spain 2004–2009
Democratic and Social Centre (Spain) politicians